Trần Thới is a village and commune in the Cái Nước District of Cà Mau Province, Vietnam. The main village of the commune was involved in a battle with American troops during the Vietnam War on Feb. 28, 1969.

Communes of Cà Mau province
Populated places in Cà Mau province